Pearl River County is a county located in the U.S. state of Mississippi. The population was 56,145 at the 2020 census. Its county seat is Poplarville.

Pearl River County comprises the Picayune, MS Micropolitan Statistical Area, which is included in the New Orleans-Metairie-Hammond, LA-MS Combined Statistical Area.

Pearl River County is a dry county, and as such, the sale, transportation, and even private possession of beverage alcohol is prohibited by law, except within Picayune and Poplarville.

History
Pearl River County was originally formed as Pearl County in 1872 from portions of Hancock and Marion Counties. Because of low population density and a small tax base, Pearl County dissolved in 1878. Present-day Pearl River County was organized in 1890 by an act of the Mississippi Legislature utilizing the same land area as its predecessor Pearl County.

On the night of April 24, 1959, Mack Charles Parker, an African-American accused of rape, was abducted from the Pearl River County jail in Poplarville by a mob and shot to death.  His body was found in the Pearl River 10 days later.  The FBI investigated and even obtained confessions from some of the eight suspects.  However, the county prosecutor refused to present evidence to a state grand jury and a federal grand jury refused to indict.  The case focused national attention on the persistence of lynching in the South and helped accelerate the American Civil Rights Movement.

On August 29, 2005, Hurricane Katrina inflicted heavy damage on the small town of Poplarville. On September 2, 2005, the 1st Battalion, 134th Field Artillery (Ohio Army National Guard) arrived at the National Guard armory in Poplarville to assist the community and Pearl River County in recovery efforts in the wake of Hurricane Katrina. Initial efforts were the security of banks, pharmacies and gas stations as well as initial responses to rural emergencies. The unit stayed for three weeks ultimately checking on every family and structure in the county. On September 5, 2005, Poplarville played host to a visit by George W. Bush, Laura Bush, and Governor Haley Barbour to Pearl River Community College in the aftermath of Hurricane Katrina.

Geography
It is the fourth-largest county in Mississippi by land area.

Major highways
  Interstate 59
  U.S. Highway 11
  Mississippi Highway 13
  Mississippi Highway 26
  Mississippi Highway 43
  Mississippi Highway 53

Adjacent counties and parishes
 Lamar County (north)
 Forrest County (northeast)
 Stone County (east)
 Hancock County (south)
 St. Tammany Parish, Louisiana (southwest)
 Washington Parish, Louisiana (west)
 Marion County (northwest)

National protected areas
 Bogue Chitto National Wildlife Refuge (part)
 De Soto National Forest (part)

Media

Newspaper
Picayune's local newspaper is the Picayune Item.

Radio
The local radio station is WRJW 1320-AM.

Television and Radio stations of New Orleans and Biloxi/Gulfport listening areas are part of Picayune area.

Demographics

2020 census

As of the 2020 United States census, there were 56,145 people, 21,020 households, and 15,078 families residing in the county.

2010 census
As of the 2010 census Pearl River County had a population of 55,834. The ethnic and racial make-up of the population was 82.2% non-Hispanic white, 12.3% African-American, 0.6% Native American, 0.4% Asian, 0.1% Pacific Islander, 0.1% non-Hispanic from some other race, 1.7% from two or more races (0.5% reporting being white and black) and 2.9% Hispanic or Latino.

2000 census
As of the census of 2000, there were 48,621 people, 18,078 households, and 13,576 families residing in the county.  The population density was 60 people per square mile (23/km2).  There were 20,610 housing units at an average density of 25 per square mile (10/km2).  The racial makeup of the county was 85.55% White, 12.18% Black or African American, 0.50% Native American, 0.27% Asian, 0.03% Pacific Islander, 0.34% from other races, and 1.13% from two or more races.  1.41% of the population were Hispanic or Latino of any race.

There were 18,078 households, out of which 34.80% had children under the age of 18 living with them, 58.30% were married couples living together, 12.50% had a female householder with no husband present, and 24.90% were non-families. 21.70% of all households were made up of individuals, and 9.00% had someone living alone who was 65 years of age or older.  The average household size was 2.65 and the average family size was 3.08.

In the county, the population was spread out, with 27.00% under the age of 18, 9.40% from 18 to 24, 27.10% from 25 to 44, 23.90% from 45 to 64, and 12.60% who were 65 years of age or older.  The median age was 36 years. For every 100 females there were 94.40 males.  For every 100 females age 18 and over, there were 91.00 males.

The median income for a household in the county was $30,912, and the median income for a family was $35,924. Males had a median income of $30,370 versus $21,519 for females. The per capita income for the county was $15,160.  About 15.50% of families and 18.40% of the population were below the poverty line, including 25.60% of those under age 18 and 12.50% of those age 65 or over.

Government
Supervisors
 District 1: Donald Hart
 District 2: Malcolm Perry
 District 3: Hudson Holliday
 District 4: Jason Spence
 District 5: Sandy Kane Smith

Countywide Elected Officials
 Sheriff - David Allison
 Circuit Clerk - Nance Fitzpatrick Stokes
 Chancery Clerk - Melinda Smith Bowman
 Tax Assessor/Collector - Gary Beech
 County Prosecutor - Michael E. Patten
 Coroner - Derek Turnage
 County Court Judge - Richelle Lumpkin
State Legislature
 Senator Angela Burks-Hill - District 40
 Senator Joseph "Mike" Seymour - District 47
 Rep. Jansen Owen - District 106
 Rep. Stacey Wilkes - District 108
 Rep. Timmy Ladner - District 93

Communities

Cities
 Lumberton (mostly in Lamar County)
 Picayune
 Poplarville (county seat)

Census-designated places
 Hide-A-Way Lake
 Nicholson

Other unincorporated communities
 Caesar
 Carriere
 Crossroads
 Henleyfield
 McNeill
 Ozona

Education
School districts include:
 Lamar County School District
 Pearl River County School District
 Picayune School District
 Poplarville Separate School District

Former school districts:
 Lumberton Public School District - Merged into the Lamar County district in 2018.

The county is in the service area of Pearl River Community College.

See also

 National Register of Historic Places listings in Pearl River County, Mississippi

References

 
Mississippi counties
1890 establishments in Mississippi
Populated places established in 1890